Since 2001, several cases of detention and search of Indian VIPs at US airports have been reported, resulting in diplomatic tensions between India and the United States. Protest from Indian authorities often led to apologies from US officials. Unlike the United States, India frequently exempts diplomats and other well-known figures from airport security checks.

Bollywood superstar Shah Rukh Khan was at the centre of three well-publicised incidents. On 15 August 2009, he was detained at Newark while on his way to celebrate India's Independence Day in Chicago. Three years later, he was stopped at New York White Plains where he had landed to address a conference at Yale University. Four years later again, he was stopped at Los Angeles International Airport. 

In December 2010, Indian Ambassador to the United States Meera Shankar and to the United Nations Hardeep Singh Puri were both targeted by security agents in two separate incidents. In September 2011, former President of India A. P. J. Abdul Kalam was searched twice – before and after boarding his plane – at New York JFK airport.

In 2015, it was announced that a list of 2,000 Indian VIPs will be included in the US Global Entry programme, which warrants expedited clearance at US airports. The list was to include former Presidents and Prime Ministers, prominent industrialists and movie stars.

References 

Diplomatic incidents
India–United States relations
United States aviation-related lists